This is a list of 449 species in Atheta, a genus of rove beetles in the family Staphylinidae.

Atheta species

 Atheta acadiensis Klimaszewski & Majka, 2007 g
 Atheta acromyrmicicola Scheerpeltz, 1976 g
 Atheta acutangula Hanssen, 1936 g
 Atheta acutiventris Vogel, 2003 g
 Atheta admista (Casey, 1910) i c g
 Atheta aegra (Heer, 1841) g
 Atheta aemula (Erichson, 1839) i c g
 Atheta aeneicollis (Sharp, 1869) g
 Atheta aeneipennis (Thomson, 1856) g
 Atheta alabama Klimaszewski and Peck, 1986 i c g
 Atheta alamedana Casey, 1910 i c g
 Atheta alesi Klimaszewski & Brunke, 2012 g
 Atheta algarum Pace, 1999 g
 Atheta allocera Eppelsheim, 1893 g
 Atheta aloconotoides Pace, 2009 g
 Atheta alpigrada Fauvel, 1900 g
 Atheta altaica Bernhauer, 1901 i c g
 Atheta alterna (Erichson, 1840) g
 Atheta amens Casey, 1911 i c g
 Atheta amicorum Lohse, 1973 g
 Atheta amicula (Stephens, 1832) i c g
 Atheta ammanni G.Benick, 1970 g
 Atheta amplicollis (Mulsant & Rey, 1873) g
 Atheta anmamontis Pace, 2009 g
 Atheta anmashanensis Pace, 2009 g
 Atheta annexa Casey, 1910 i c g
 Atheta antennaria (Fauvel, 1875) g
 Atheta aquatica (Thomson, 1852) g
 Atheta aquatilis (Thomson, 1867) g
 Atheta astuta Casey, 1910 i c g
 Atheta atomaria (Kraatz, 1856) g
 Atheta atomica Casey, 1911 i c g
 Atheta atramentaria (Gyllenhal, 1810) g
 Atheta atricolor (Sharp, 1869) g
 Atheta audens Casey, 1911 i c g
 Atheta autumnalis (Erichson, 1839) g
 Atheta bakeri Bernhauer, 1909 i c g
 Atheta baringiana Bernhauer, 1907 i c g
 Atheta basicornis (Mulsant & Rey, 1852) g
 Atheta benickiella Brundin, 1948 g
 Atheta bidenticauda Bernhauer, 1907 i c g
 Atheta bihamata Fauvel, 1900 g
 Atheta blatchleyi Bernhauer and Scheerpeltz, 1926 i c g
 Atheta boleticola J.Sahlberg, 1876 g
 Atheta boletophila (Thomson, 1856) g
 Atheta borealis Klimaszewski & Langor, 2011 g
 Atheta boreella Brundin, 1948 g
 Atheta botanicarum Muona, 1983 g
 Atheta britanniae Bernhauer & Scheerpeltz, 1926 g
 Atheta britteni Joy, 1913 g
 Atheta brumalis Casey, 1910 i c g
 Atheta brunnea (Fabricius, 1798) g
 Atheta brunneipennis (Thomson, 1852) g
 Atheta brunnipes (Mulsant & Rey, 1852) g
 Atheta brunswickensis Klimaszewski in Klimaszewski, Sweeney, Price and Pelletier, 2005 i c g
 Atheta burlei Tronquet, 1999 g
 Atheta burwelli (Lohse in Lohse, Klimaszewski and Smetana, 1990) i c g
 Atheta cadeti Klimaszewski & Godin, 2008 g
 Atheta californica Bernhauer, 1907 i c g
 Atheta campbelli (Lohse in Lohse, Klimaszewski and Smetana, 1990) i c g
 Atheta campbelliana (Lohse in Lohse, Klimaszewski and Smetana, 1990) i c g
 Atheta canescens (Sharp, 1869) g
 Atheta capsularis Klimaszewski in Klimaszewski, Sweeney, Price and Pelletier, 2005 i c g
 Atheta caribou (Lohse in Lohse, Klimaszewski and Smetana, 1990) i c g
 Atheta cariei Pace, 1984 g
 Atheta castanoptera (Mannerheim, 1830) g
 Atheta catula Casey, 1910 i c g
 Atheta cauta (Erichson, 1837) g
 Atheta celata (Erichson, 1837) g
 Atheta centropunctata Bernhauer, 1909 i c g
 Atheta cephalotes Bernhauer, 1901 g
 Atheta cheersae Klimaszewski in Klimaszewski and Winchester, 2002 i c g
 Atheta cinnamoptera (Thomson, 1856) g
 Atheta circulicollis Lohse in Lohse, Klimaszewski and Smetana, 1990 i c g
 Atheta ciu Pace, 1993 g
 Atheta claricella Casey, 1910 i c g
 Atheta clienta (Casey, 1911) i c g
 Atheta clientula (Erichson, 1839) g
 Atheta coelifrons (Mulsant & Rey, 1875) g
 Atheta collusina Pace, 2009 g
 Atheta concessa Casey, 1911 i c g
 Atheta conformis (Erichson, 1840) g
 Atheta confusa (Märkel, 1844) g
 Atheta consueta (Mulsant & Rey, 1874) g
 Atheta contristata (Kraatz, 1856) g
 Atheta convexiuscula (Mulsant & Rey, 1875) g
 Atheta cornelli Pace, 1997 i c g
 Atheta coruscula (Casey, 1910) i c g
 Atheta crassicornis (Fabricius, 1793) g
 Atheta crenulata Bernhauer, 1907 i c g
 Atheta crenuliventris Bernhauer, 1907 i c g
 Atheta cribripennis (J.Sahlberg, 1890) g
 Atheta cryptica (Lohse in Lohse, Klimaszewski and Smetana, 1990) i c g
 Atheta cursor (Mäklin in Mannerheim, 1852) i c g
 Atheta curvaminis Pace, 2009 g
 Atheta curvipennis Klimaszewski & Langor, 2011 g
 Atheta dadopora Thomson, 1867 i c g
 Atheta dama Casey, 1910 i c g
 Atheta debilis (Erichson, 1837) g
 Atheta decepta (Mulsant & Rey, 1873) g
 Atheta delumbis Casey, 1911 i c g
 Atheta demissa (Notman, 1921) i c g
 Atheta dentiventris Bernhauer, 1907 g
 Atheta difficilis (C.Brisout de Barneville, 1860) g
 Atheta diffidens (Casey, 1910) i c g
 Atheta dilaticornis (Kraatz, 1856) g
 Atheta discipula Casey, 1910 i c g
 Atheta disparilis (Casey, 1910) i c g
 Atheta districta Casey, 1911 i c g
 Atheta diversa (Sharp, 1869) g
 Atheta divisa (Märkel, 1844) g
 Atheta dubiosa Benick, 1934 g
 Atheta dwinensis Poppius, 1908 g
 Atheta ebenina (Mulsant & Rey, 1873) g
 Atheta ehnstroemi Baranowski, 1982 g
 Atheta elephanticola Pace, 1998 g
 Atheta enitescens Casey, 1910 i c g
 Atheta episcopalis Bernhauer, 1910 g
 Atheta ermischi Benick, 1934 g
 Atheta esmeraldae Casey, 1911 i c g
 Atheta esuriens Assing, 2010
 Atheta europaea Likovský, 1984 g
 Atheta euryptera (Stephens, 1832) g
 Atheta excellens (Kraatz, 1856) g
 Atheta excelsa Bernhauer, 1911 g
 Atheta fanatica Casey, 1910 i c g
 Atheta fascinans (Casey, 1911) i c g
 Atheta fenyesi Bernhauer, 1907 i c g
 Atheta festinans (Erichson, 1839) i c g
 Atheta ficta Casey, 1910 i c g
 Atheta fimorum (C.Brisout de Barneville, 1860) g
 Atheta finita Moore and Legner, 1975 i c g
 Atheta flavipes (Gravenhorst, 1806) g
 Atheta flaviventris (Casey, 1911) i c g
 Atheta formalis (Casey, 1911) i c g
 Atheta formicetorum Bernhauer, 1907 g
 Atheta formosanorum Puthz, 1995 g
 Atheta fossiceps Scheerpeltz, 1964 g
 Atheta foveicollis (Kraatz, 1856) g
 Atheta freta Casey, 1910 i c g
 Atheta frigida J.Sahlberg, 1880 g
 Atheta frosti Bernhauer, 1909 i c g
 Atheta fulgens Bernhauer, 1907 i c g
 Atheta fulgida Bernhauer, 1907 i c g
 Atheta fulviceps Notman, 1920 i c g
 Atheta fungicola (Thomson, 1852) g
 Atheta fungivora (Thomson, 1867) g
 Atheta furtiva Cameron, 1939 g
 Atheta fussi (Bernhauer, 1908) g
 Atheta gagatina (Baudi, 1848) g
 Atheta ganglbaueri Brundin, 1948 g
 Atheta gigas Pace, 2009 g
 Atheta glabricula Thomson, 1867 g
 Atheta glabriculoides Strand, 1958 g
 Atheta graminicola (Gravenhorst, 1806) i c g
 Atheta haematica (Eppelsheim, 1884) g
 Atheta haligena (Wollaston, 1857) g
 Atheta hamgyongsani Pasnik, 2001 g
 Atheta hampshirensis Bernhauer, 1909 i c g
 Atheta harwoodi Williams, 1930 i c g
 Atheta hepatica (Erichson, 1839) g
 Atheta hesperica (Casey, 1910) i c g
 Atheta heymesi Hubenthal, 1913 g
 Atheta hilaris Fenyes, 1909 i c g
 Atheta holmbergi Bernhauer, 1907 i c g
 Atheta houstoni Casey, 1910 i c g
 Atheta hummleri Bernhauer, 1898 g
 Atheta hybrida (Sharp, 1869) g
 Atheta hypnorum (Kiesenwetter, 1850) g
 Atheta iheringi Bernhauer, 1908 g
 Atheta immucronata Pace, 1999 g
 Atheta immunis (Casey, 1910) i c
 Atheta impressipennis Bernhauer, 1909 i c g
 Atheta inanis (Casey, 1910) i c g
 Atheta incisicauda Pace, 1984 g
 Atheta incisicollis G.Benick, 1981 g
 Atheta incognita (Sharp, 1869) g
 Atheta incommoda Brundin, 1948 g
 Atheta indubia (Sharp, 1869) g
 Atheta inermis (Fauvel, 1878) g
 Atheta inquinula (Gravenhorst, 1802) g
 Atheta insignicollis (Fauvel, 1878) g
 Atheta insignis (Wollaston, 1854) g
 Atheta insolida (Casey, 1910) i c g
 Atheta intecta (Casey, 1910) i c g
 Atheta intermedia (Thomson, 1852) g
 Atheta invenusta (Casey, 1910) i c g
 Atheta irrita Casey, 1911 i c g
 Atheta irrupta (Casey, 1910) i c g
 Atheta ischnocera Thomson, 1870 g
 Atheta jangtaesanensis Lee & Ahn g
 Atheta kangsonica Pasnik, 2001 g
 Atheta kansana Casey, 1911 i c g
 Atheta kaohsiungicola Pace, 2009 g
 Atheta kaohsiungnesis Pace, 2009 g
 Atheta kaunshanchiensis Pace, 2009 g
 Atheta kawachiensis Sawada, 1974 g
 Atheta keeni Casey, 1910 i c g
 Atheta kerstensi Benick, 1968 g
 Atheta klagesi Bernhauer, 1909 i c g
 Atheta knabli G.Benick, 1938 g
 Atheta kobensis Cameron, 1933 g
 Atheta koreana Bernhauer, 1923 g
 Atheta kuennemanni G.Benick, 1975 g
 Atheta laetula Fenyes, 1909 i c g
 Atheta laevana (Mulsant & Rey, 1852) g
 Atheta laevicauda J.Sahlberg, 1876 g
 Atheta lagunae (Lohse in Lohse, Klimaszewski and Smetana, 1990) i c g
 Atheta lapponica J.Sahlberg, 1876 g
 Atheta laticeps (Thomson, 1856) g
 Atheta laticollis (Stephens, 1832) g
 Atheta latifemorata Brundin, 1940 g
 Atheta leileri (Palm, 1981) g
 Atheta leonhardi Bernhauer, 1911 g
 Atheta lewisiana Cameron, 1933 g
 Atheta liliputana (Brisout de Barneville, 1860) g
 Atheta limulina Casey, 1911 i c g
 Atheta linderi (Brisout de Barneville, 1863) g
 Atheta lindrothi Klimaszewski & Langor, 2011 g
 Atheta lippa (Casey, 1911) i c g
 Atheta liturata (Stephens, 1832) g
 Atheta longearmata Pace, 2009 g
 Atheta longiclava (Casey, 1910) i c g
 Atheta longicornis (Gravenhorst, 1802) i c g
 Atheta lucana (Casey, 1910) i c g
 Atheta lucida (Dodero, 1922) g
 Atheta lucifuga Klimaszewski and Peck, 1986 i c g
 Atheta luctifera Bernhauer, 1906 i c g
 Atheta luctuosa (Mulsant & Rey, 1853) g
 Atheta luridipennis (Mannerheim, 1830) g
 Atheta luridipennoides Pace, 2009 g
 Atheta lymphatica Casey, 1911 i c g
 Atheta macrocera (Thomson, 1856) g
 Atheta macrops Notman, 1920 i c g
 Atheta malleiformis G.Benick, 1975 g
 Atheta malleus Joy, 1913 g
 Atheta marcescens Casey, 1911 i c g
 Atheta marcida (Erichson, 1837) g
 Atheta mariei Sainte-Claire Deville, 1927 g
 Atheta marinica Casey, 1910 i c g
 Atheta martini Lohse in Lohse, Klimaszewski and Smetana, 1990 i c g
 Atheta membranata G.Benick, 1974 g
 Atheta metlakatlana Bernhauer, 1909 i c g
 Atheta microelytrata Klimaszewski & Godin, 2012 g
 Atheta microparvula Pace, 2009 g
 Atheta militaris Bernhauer, 1909 i c g
 Atheta mina (Casey, 1910) i c g
 Atheta miniscula (Brisout, 1860) g
 Atheta minuscula (Brisout de Barneville, 1859) g
 Atheta modesta (Melsheimer, 1844) i c g
 Atheta monacha Bernhauer, 1899 g
 Atheta monticola (Thomson, 1852) g
 Atheta muris Sawada, 1974 g
 Atheta myrmecobia (Kraatz, 1856) g
 Atheta nacta Casey, 1911 i c g
 Atheta nanella (Casey, 1906) i c g
 Atheta nearctica (Lohse in Lohse, Klimaszewski and Smetana, 1990) i c g
 Atheta negligens (Mulsant & Rey, 1873) g
 Atheta neomexicana Fenyes, 1909 i c g
 Atheta nescia (Casey, 1910) i c g
 Atheta nesslingi Bernhauer, 1928 g
 Atheta nidicola (Johansen, 1914) g
 Atheta nigra (Kraatz, 1856) g
 Atheta nigricornis (Thomson, 1852) i c g
 Atheta nigrifrons (Erichson, 1839) g
 Atheta nigripennis (Erichson, 1839) g
 Atheta nigripes (Thomson, 1856) g
 Atheta nigrita Fenyes, 1909 i c g
 Atheta nigritula (Gravenhorst, 1802) i c g
 Atheta novaescotiae Klimaszewski & Majka in Klimaszewski, Majka & Langor, 2006 i c g b
 Atheta nugator Casey, 1911 i c g
 Atheta oblita (Erichson, 1839) g
 Atheta obsequens Casey, 1911 i c g
 Atheta obtusangula Joy, 1913 g
 Atheta occidentalis Bernhauer, 1906 i c g
 Atheta occulta (Erichson, 1837) g
 Atheta olaae Sharp, 1908 i c g
 Atheta oraria (Kraatz, 1856) g
 Atheta orbata (Erichson, 1837) g
 Atheta orcina (Fauvel, 1875) g
 Atheta ordinata Casey, 1910 i c g
 Atheta oregonensis Bernhauer, 1909 i c g
 Atheta orphana (Erichson, 1837) g
 Atheta oxypodoides Brundin, 1952 g
 Atheta pachycera (Eppelsheim, 1893) g
 Atheta pacifica (Casey, 1910) i c g
 Atheta paedida (Erichson, 1840) g
 Atheta paganella Casey, 1910 i c g
 Atheta palleola (Erichson, 1837) g
 Atheta pallidicornis (Thomson, 1856) i c g
 Atheta pandionis Scheerpeltz, 1958 g
 Atheta paracrassicornis Brundin, 1954 g
 Atheta parapicipennis Brundin, 1954 g
 Atheta parcior Bernhauer, 1927 g
 Atheta particula (Casey, 1910) i c g
 Atheta parvicornis (Mulsant & Rey, 1873) g
 Atheta parvipennis Bernhauer, 1907 i c g
 Atheta pasniki Lee & Ahn g
 Atheta pavidula Casey, 1911 i c g
 Atheta pechlaneri Scheerpeltz, 1933 g
 Atheta pecki Klimaszewski & Langor, 2011 g
 Atheta pedicularis (Melsheimer, 1844) i c g
 Atheta peinantaensis Pace, 2009 g
 Atheta peinantamontis Pace, 2009 g
 Atheta pennsylvanica Bernhauer, 1907 i c g b
 Atheta peregrina (Kraatz, 1859) g
 Atheta perpera Casey, 1910 i c g
 Atheta personata (Casey, 1910) i c g
 Atheta pervagata Benick, 1975 g
 Atheta perversa Casey, 1910 i c g
 Atheta pfaundleri Benick, 1940 g
 Atheta picipennis (Mannerheim, 1843) i c g
 Atheta picipennoides Hanssen, 1932 g
 Atheta picipes (Thomson, 1856) g
 Atheta pilicornis (Thomson, 1852) g
 Atheta piligera J.Sahlberg, 1876 g
 Atheta pimalis (Casey, 1910) i c g
 Atheta pittionii Scheerpeltz, 1950 g
 Atheta platanoffi Brundin, 1948 i c g
 Atheta platonoffi Brundin, 1948 g
 Atheta portusveneris Normand, 1920 g
 Atheta praesaga (Casey, 1910) i c g
 Atheta pratensis (Mäklin in Mannerheim, 1852) i c g
 Atheta procera (Kraatz, 1856) g
 Atheta promota Casey, 1910 i c g
 Atheta properans Casey, 1910 i c g
 Atheta prudhoensis (Lohse in Lohse, Klimaszewski and Smetana, 1990) i c g
 Atheta pruinosa (Kraatz, 1856) g
 Atheta pseudoatomaria Bernhauer, 1909 i c g
 Atheta pseudocrenuliventris Klimaszewski in Klimaszewski, Sweeney, Price and Pelletier, 2005 i c g
 Atheta pseudodistricta Klimaszewski & Langor, 2011 g
 Atheta pseudoelogantula (Bernhauer, 1807) g
 Atheta pseudomembranata Tronquet, 2007 g
 Atheta pseudometlakatlana Klimaszewski & Godin, 2008 g
 Atheta pseudomodesta Klimaszewski, 2007 g
 Atheta pseudosubtilis Klimaszewski & Langor, 2011 g
 Atheta pseudovilis Bernhauer, 1907 i c g
 Atheta pugnans Fenyes, 1920 i c g
 Atheta puncticollis Benick, 1938 g
 Atheta putrida (Kraatz, 1856) g
 Atheta pyongangsani Pasnik, 2001 g
 Atheta quadricarinata Pace, 2009 g
 Atheta quaesita (Casey, 1910) i c g
 Atheta quercea Tronquet, 2012 g
 Atheta ravilla (Erichson, 1839) g
 Atheta reformata Casey, 1911 i c g
 Atheta regenerans Casey, 1911 i c g
 Atheta regissalmonis (Lohse in Lohse, Klimaszewski and Smetana, 1990) i c g
 Atheta reissi G.Benick, 1936 g
 Atheta reitteriana Bernhauer, 1939 g
 Atheta relicta Casey, 1911 i c g
 Atheta remissa (Casey, 1910) i c g
 Atheta remulsa Casey, 1910 i c g
 Atheta reposita Casey, 1910 i c g
 Atheta restricta Casey, 1911 i c
 Atheta reticula Casey, 1910 i c g
 Atheta reunionensis Pace, 1984 g
 Atheta rhenana G.Benick, 1965 g
 Atheta ringi Klimaszewski in Klimaszewski and Winchester, 2002 i c g
 Atheta riparia Klimaszewski & Godin, 2012 g
 Atheta ririkoae Sawada, 1989 g
 Atheta rugulosa (Heer, 1839) g
 Atheta rurigena Casey, 1911 i c g
 Atheta sana Casey, 1910 i c g
 Atheta sanguinolenta (Wollaston, 1854) g
 Atheta savardae Klimaszewski & Majka, 2007 g
 Atheta scapularis (Sahlberg, 1831) g
 Atheta scrobicollis (Kraatz, 1859) g
 Atheta sculptisoma Klimaszewski & Langor, 2011 g
 Atheta semidentiventris Lee & Ahn g
 Atheta sequanica (C.Brisout de Barneville, 1860) g
 Atheta serrata Benick, 1938 g
 Atheta setigera (Sharp, 1869) g
 Atheta silvatica Bernhauer, 1907 g
 Atheta sitiens (Casey, 1910) i c g
 Atheta smetanai (Lohse in Lohse, Klimaszewski and Smetana, 1990) i c g
 Atheta smetanaiella Pace, 2009 g
 Atheta sodalis (Erichson, 1837) i c g
 Atheta sogai Pace, 1984 g
 Atheta sogamensis Pasnik, 2001 g
 Atheta sordida  b
 Atheta sordidula (Erichson, 1837) g
 Atheta sparreschneideri Munster, 1922 i c g
 Atheta sparsepunctata Bernhauer, 1907 i c g
 Atheta spatula (Fauvel, 1875) g
 Atheta spatuloides Benick, 1939 g
 Atheta speluncicollis Bernhauer, 1909 g
 Atheta spiniventris Bernhauer, 1907 g
 Atheta spinula Sawada, 1970 g
 Atheta stercoris Fenyes, 1920 i c g
 Atheta stoica Casey, 1911 i c g
 Atheta strandiella Brundin, 1954 g
 Atheta strigosula Casey, 1910 i c g
 Atheta subcavicola (Brisout de Barneville, 1863) g
 Atheta subcrenulata Bernhauer, 1907 g
 Atheta subglabra (Sharp, 1869) g
 Atheta sublucens Bernhauer, 1909 i c g
 Atheta subnigritula Cameron, 1950 g
 Atheta subrugosa (Kiesenwetter, 1848) g
 Atheta subsinuata (Erichson, 1839) g
 Atheta subterranea (Mulsant & Rey, 1853) g
 Atheta subtilis (Scriba, 1866) g
 Atheta sundti Strand, 1971 g
 Atheta surgens (Casey, 1910) i c g
 Atheta suspiciosa (Motschulsky, 1858) g
 Atheta taichungensis Puthz, 1995 g
 Atheta taiwafallax Pace, 2009 g
 Atheta taiwamontana Pace, 2009 g
 Atheta taiwanensis Puthz, 1995 g
 Atheta taiwanultima Pace, 2009 g
 Atheta taiwaparva Pace, 2009 g
 Atheta taiwasolitaria Pace, 2009 g
 Atheta talpa (Heer, 1841) g
 Atheta taxiceroides Munster, 1935 g
 Atheta temporalis Casey, 1910 i c g
 Atheta tepida (Casey, 1910) i c g
 Atheta terranovae Klimaszewski & Langor, 2011 g
 Atheta testaceipes (Heer, 1839) g
 Atheta texana Casey, 1910 i c g
 Atheta thulea Poppius, 1909 g
 Atheta tibialis (Heer, 1839) g
 Atheta tokiokai Sawada, 1971 g
 Atheta tonensis Pace, 2009 g
 Atheta tractabilis Casey, 1910 i c g
 Atheta trangrediens G.Benick, 1974 g
 Atheta transposita (Mulsant & Rey, 1875) g
 Atheta triangulum (Kraatz, 1856) g
 Atheta trinotata (Kraatz, 1856) g
 Atheta troglophila Klimaszewski and Peck, 1986 i c g
 Atheta truncativentris Bernhauer, 1907 i c g
 Atheta tubericauda Bernhauer, 1909 i c g
 Atheta turpicola (Casey, 1910) i c g
 Atheta umbonalis Casey, 1910 i c g
 Atheta unica (Casey, 1910) i c g
 Atheta unigena Casey, 1910 i c g
 Atheta vacans (Casey, 1910) i c g
 Atheta vaga Heer, 1839 g
 Atheta varendorffiana Bernhauer & Scheerpeltz, 1934 g
 Atheta ventricosa Bernhauer, 1907 i c g b
 Atheta vestita (Gravenhorst, 1806) g
 Atheta vicaria (Casey, 1910) g
 Atheta voeslauensis Bernhauer, 1944 g
 Atheta vomerum Pace, 2009 g
 Atheta weedi Casey, 1910 i c g
 Atheta whitehorsensis Klimaszewski & Godin, 2012 g
 Atheta wireni Brundin, 1948 g
 Atheta wrangeli (Casey, 1910) i c g
 Atheta xanthopus (Thomson, 1856) g
 Atheta zealandica Cameron, 1945 g
 Atheta zosterae (Thomson, 1856) g

Data sources: i = ITIS, c = Catalogue of Life, g = GBIF, b = Bugguide.net

References

Atheta
Articles created by Qbugbot